Mount Scopus Memorial College, commonly known as Mount Scopus, or just Scopus, is an independent Modern Orthodox Jewish comprehensive co-educational early learning, primary, and secondary day school, located in the Melbourne suburb of Burwood, Victoria, Australia. Since 2007, Rabbi James Kennard has been principal of Mount Scopus Memorial College.

History 
Mount Scopus Memorial College opened on St Kilda Road in Melbourne, Victoria, Australia in 1949, taking its name from Mount Scopus in Jerusalem, which remained under Israeli control after the 1948 Arab-Israeli War.

Mount Scopus College was the first co-educational Jewish day school in Melbourne, originally serving a student population of 143. It was established to meet the educational needs of the influx of Holocaust refugees to the Melbourne community. In 1953, the college moved to a larger campus in Burwood, which was designed by Melbourne's leading Jewish architect Anatol Kagan in association with Dr. Ernest Fooks.  There are also campuses in St Kilda East and Caulfield South. Until 1996 there was a branch in Kew.

In terms of Victorian Certificate of Education results, Mount Scopus was the state's highest performing school in 2009.

Principals
The principal of Mount Scopus Memorial College is Rabbi James Kennard, who replaced Hilton Rubin in 2007. Previous principals have included Abraham Feiglin, Max Wahlhaus, Aleksander Ranoschy, Dr. Steven Lorch and Rabbi William Altshul.

Sherut Leumi and ulpan 
Mount Scopus College was the first of the Melbourne Jewish Day Schools to take part in the Sherut Leumi program. Every year, four Israeli women are sent to Mount Scopus as part of their Israeli National Service. They are a major component of Scopus' informal Jewish Studies team. Mount Scopus offers an Ulpan program in which tenth graders travel to Israel for 6–10 weeks. In 2007 and 2010, more than half of the school's tenth graders took part in this program.

Performing arts 
The performing arts are considered an important part of school life at Mount Scopus Memorial College.

Mount Scopus Memorial College is an IB school. Drama and Dance electives are available to students years 8–12. Theatre Studies is taught in VCE with excellent results. Music is taught from primary through to VCE, with an instrumental program available to students years 2–12.

The performing arts calendar includes an annual College Musical, Senior School Play, VCE Theatre Studies Play, Middle-school House Plays, Primary Musical (every two years), multiple Music Soirees and an 'Idol' singing competition.

Some recent productions include Bye Bye Birdie (2002), Grease (2003), Bugsy Malone (2004), The Wizard of Oz (2005), Seussical (2006), Joseph and the Technicolor Dreamcoat (2007), Disney's High School Musical (2008), The Sound of Music (2009), The Crucible (2009), Annie (2010), Disney's Beauty and the Beast (2011), Oliver! (2012), Little Shop of Horrors (2013). The 2012 production of Metamorphoses was awarded the Lyrebird Youth Awards for Best Production, Best Director – Evie Gawenda (Director of Performing Arts 2008–Current), Best Lighting and Best interpretation of script through the use of Multimedia – Evie Gawenda and Gideon Szental.

 Sport 
Mount Scopus is a member of the Eastern Independent Schools of Melbourne (EISM).

 EISM Premierships 
Mount Scopus has won the following EISM senior premierships.

Combined:

 Swimming (3) - 1983, 1984, 1985

Boys:

 Badminton (4) - 2006, 2007, 2014, 2022
 Basketball - 2022
 Cricket - 1993
 Football - 2006
 Hockey (2) - 2005, 2008
 Soccer (9) - 1999, 2003, 2004, 2006, 2007, 2010, 2011, 2012, 2013
 Softball (10) - 2009, 2011, 2012, 2013, 2014, 2015, 2016, 2017, 2020, 2021
 Table Tennis (9) - 1999, 2001, 2002, 2003, 2004, 2007, 2013, 2014, 2019
 Tennis (7) - 1990, 2002, 2015, 2016, 2019, 2020, 2022
 Volleyball - 2022

Girls:

 Athletics - 1971
 Basketball (2) - 1979, 1980
 Bowling - 2004
 Cricket - 2008
 Hockey (6) - 1983, 1998, 2002, 2003, 2004, 2007
 Soccer (5) - 2014, 2015, 2016, 2017, 2022
 Softball (7) - 1983, 2000, 2001, 2002, 2014, 2017, 2018
 Swimming (9) - 1972, 1973, 1974, 1977, 1978, 1979, 1980, 1981, 1982
 Table Tennis (3) - 2003, 2021, 2022
 Tennis (5) - 2004, 2005, 2020, 2021, 2022
 Volleyball (2) - 1980, 1981

Mount Scopus have won the following Year 9 EISM Premierships

Year 9 Boys:
 Football - 2014, 2019
 Indoor Soccer - 2012, 2014, 2016, 2017, 2018, 2019, 2022
 Soccer - 2011, 2013, 2017, 2019
 Softball - 2011, 2018
 Table Tennis - 2010, 2017
 Tennis - 2011, 2013, 2017
 Touch Rugby - 2013
 Ultimate Frisbee - 2017, 2022
 Volleyball - 2017, 2018

Year 9 Girls:
 Hockey - 2014, 2017
 Softball - 2012, 2014, 2015, 2017
 Table Tennis - 2015, 2019
 Tennis - 2019
 Touch Rugby - 2012, 2013
 Volleyball - 2014

 Notable alumni 

Louise Adler – publisher
Peter Alexander – fashion designer
Neal Ashkanasy – emotional intelligence researcher
Harry Sheezel – AFL player at North Melbourne Football Club
Josh Burns – Member for Macnamara in the Australian House of Representatives
Michael Danby MP – Federal politician, Member for Melbourne Ports
 Eva Duldig (born 1938) - Austrian-born Australian and Dutch tennis player, author
Geoffrey Edelsten – entrepreneur
Alan Finkel – former Chancellor of Monash University, Australia's chief scientist
Josh Frydenberg MP – Treasurer of Australia and member for Kooyong in the Australian House of Representatives
Deborah Glass – Victorian Ombudsman
Michael Gudinski – music industry and entertainment entrepreneur
Michelle Haber – cancer researcher, also attended Moriah College
Janet Hiller – epidemiologist
Ariel Kaplan – The Saddle Club'' actress
Dena Kaplan – actress
Michael Klinger – professional cricketer and former Australian Under 19's cricket captain
Solomon Lew – business mogul
Eva Orner – filmmaker and Academy Award winner
Elliot Perlman – award-winning novelist, script-writer and barrister
Mark Regev – former spokesman for the Israeli Prime Minister and former ambassador of Israel to the United Kingdom
David Southwick – Member of the Legislative Assembly in Victoria
Leon Sterling – Dean of the Faculty of Information and Communication Technologies at Swinburne University of Technology
David Zalcberg – table tennis player
Sharon Lewin - Professor and researcher of immunology

See also 

 List of non-government schools in Victoria
 Judaism in Australia

References

External links
 Mount Scopus Memorial College website

Educational institutions established in 1949
Eastern Independent Schools of Melbourne
Jewish day schools
Jewish schools in Melbourne
1949 establishments in Australia
Buildings and structures in the City of Whitehorse